Giannis Agouris (Greek: Γιάννης Αγγούρης, July 20, 1930 - August 1, 2006) was a Greek writer and journalist from Achaia.

Biography

Giannis Agouris was born in Aroania (now part of Kalavryta, Greece) on July 20, 1930.  He was the second of five children borne to Georgios Agouris and Panayota Psarrou.  He finished high school in Kalavryta and studied Political Science and Law in Athens.  After the completion of his academic education he served in the Greek Army as lieutenant of the Reserves. Upon his honorable discharge from the Army he entered the field of journalism in the mid-1950s.  He worked for various political and economic newspapers in Athens, and for Greek State Radio & TV (ERT) as director of its morning news zone.  He served for many years as chief editor of Naftemporiki (Ναυτεμπορική), the largest economic newspaper of Greece, until his retirement in 1993.  For many years, he was a member of the economic council of the powerful Journalists' Union of the Athens Daily Newspapers (ESIEA).  After retiring from active journalism, he turned to writing.  He authored three books (the third is in the process of being published).  He died suddenly on August 1, 2006 at his summer residence. He is survived by his wife of 45 years, Fotini Antonopoulou, his two daughters, Peggy Agouris and Gina Agouris, and his two granddaughters, Ioanna Ziotis of Athens, Greece, and Chloe Jane Stefanidis of Washington, DC, USA.

Books

Sopoto, patrida mou (Σοπωτό, πατρίδα μου = Sopoto, my home)
Dimosiografiki poreia (Δημοσιογραφική πορεία = Journalistic Way)

References
The first version of the article is translated and is based from the article at the Greek Wikipedia (el:Main Page)

1930 births
2006 deaths
People from Aroania
Greek journalists
Greek writers
20th-century journalists